Kimora Blac is the stage name of Von Nguyen, an American drag queen and television personality, best known for competing on the ninth season of RuPaul's Drag Race.

Early life 
Von Nguyen was born on December 15, 1988, in Wichita, Kansas. She is of Vietnamese heritage. Von Nguyen grew up in Elk Grove, California, then moved to Las Vegas, Nevada, where she resided when she was cast to appear on RuPaul's Drag Race. Her drag name comes from Kimora Lee Simmons and her favorite color black, with the "k" removed because "it added a twist".

Career

RuPaul's Drag Race 

She first did amateur drag when she was fifteen with Dragula contestant Melissa Befierce. She started doing professional drag when she was eighteen. She auditioned for Drag Race three different times.

Kimora Blac was announced as one of fourteen contestants for the ninth season of RuPaul's Drag Race on February 2, 2017. After being declared safe in episode one, she was placed in the bottom two in the second episode with Jaymes Mansfield and won a lip sync against her to "Love Shack" by The B-52's. She was eliminated in the third episode after lip syncing to "Holding Out for a Hero" by Bonnie Tyler, against Aja.

She appeared as a guest for the first challenge in the premiere of season eleven of Drag Race.

Other work 

In September 2017, Blac recreated the September 2014 cover of Paper magazine with Kim Kardashian, which was given positive reception by Kardashian on Twitter.

Blac became the host for the WOWPresents internet series, "Wait, What?" where she's asked trivia questions with alternating categories. Her co-hosts for the show included Mariah, Derrick Barry, Gia Gunn, Laganja Estranja, Ongina, Jaidynn Diore-Fierce and Jasmine Masters. The first episode was available on YouTube on October 8, 2018.

She appeared as a guest for two episodes of The Trixie & Katya Show in March 2018. She appeared in an episode of the television series Botched with Trinity the Tuck in December 2018. Blac joined Eve in her lip sync performance of Supermodel by RuPaul during her appearance on The Talk.

She was a featured performer during Jennifer Lopez's performance at the 2022 iHeartRadio Music Awards.

She has a beauty and makeup channel on YouTube.

Personal life 
Nguyen cites Erika Jayne and Paris Hilton along with Simmons and Kardashian as inspirations to her drag aesthetic.

Kimora's drag daughter is Amaya Blac.

Filmography

Film

Television

Web series

Music videos

References

External links 

 

1988 births
Living people
Asian-American drag queens
American people of Vietnamese descent
American YouTubers
Beauty and makeup YouTubers
American LGBT people of Asian descent
LGBT people from Kansas
LGBT YouTubers
People from Elk Grove, California
People from Las Vegas
People from Wichita, Kansas
Kimora Blac
20th-century American LGBT people
21st-century American LGBT people